Allison Lake Provincial Park is a provincial park in British Columbia, Canada, located 28 kilometres north of Princeton, British Columbia.  The park, which is 23 ha. in size, was established July 26, 1960. It is mainly a recreation area, offering camping, swimming and fishing. The park contains mostly aspen.

See also
Allison Pass
John Fall Allison

External links
Allison Lake Provincial Park.

Provincial parks of British Columbia
Similkameen Country
1960 establishments in British Columbia